Pristhesancus is a genus of insects in the family Reduviidae, the assassin bugs.  Species have been recorded from Australia and certain Pacific Islands.

Species
BioLib includes:

 Pristhesancus adustus Miller, 1958
 Pristhesancus albipennis Walker, 1873
 Pristhesancus apicalis Miller, 1958
 Pristhesancus aruanus Miller, 1953
 Pristhesancus aurantiacus Breddin, 1903
 Pristhesancus australis Malipatil, 1986
 Pristhesancus blandus Miller, 1958
 Pristhesancus browni Miller, 1958
 Pristhesancus castrensis Miller, 1958
 Pristhesancus chessmanae Miller, 1958
 Pristhesancus chlamydatus Miller, 1958
 Pristhesancus chrysitis Distant, 1903
 Pristhesancus cinctipes Miller, 1958
 Pristhesancus compositus Miller, 1958
 Pristhesancus congrex Stål, 1863
 Pristhesancus consignatus Miller, 1958
 Pristhesancus cruentatus Miller, 1958
 Pristhesancus cupreus Miller, 1958
 Pristhesancus cyaniventris Guérin, 1830
 Pristhesancus dorycus (Boisduval, 1835)
 Pristhesancus dubius Miller, 1958
 Pristhesancus eques Miller, 1958
 Pristhesancus falloui Miller, 1958
 Pristhesancus femoralis Horváth, 1900
 Pristhesancus fimbriatus Miller, 1958
 Pristhesancus frogatti Miller, 1958
 Pristhesancus furcifer Stål, 1863
 Pristhesancus galeritius Dispons, 1971
 Pristhesancus gracilis Miller, 1958
 Pristhesancus grassator Bergroth, 1895
 Pristhesancus grossus Miller, 1958
 Pristhesancus hilaris Miller, 1958
 Pristhesancus illustris Stal, 1866
 Pristhesancus inconspicuus Distant, 1911
 Pristhesancus inops Miller, 1958
 Pristhesancus inustus Miller, 1958
 Pristhesancus jucundus Miller, 1958
 Pristhesancus lateralis Miller, 1958
 Pristhesancus latro Miller, 1958
 Pristhesancus leeweni Miller, 1958
 Pristhesancus lepidus Miller, 1958
 Pristhesancus leveri Miller, 1958
 Pristhesancus littoralis Miller, 1958
 Pristhesancus lotus Miller, 1958
 Pristhesancus lugubris Miller, 1958
 Pristhesancus lundqvisti Miller, 1958
 Pristhesancus lurco Miller, 1958
 Pristhesancus modestus Breddin, 1903
 Pristhesancus morio Miller, 1958
 Pristhesancus mundus Miller, 1958
 Pristhesancus nemoralis Miller, 1958
 Pristhesancus nigritus Malipatil, 1986
 Pristhesancus nigriventris Miller, 1958
 Pristhesancus nigroannulatus Distant, 1903
 Pristhesancus ochroleucus Miller, 1958
 Pristhesancus olthofi Miller, 1958
 Pristhesancus pagdeni Miller, 1958
 Pristhesancus papuensis Stål, 1861
 Pristhesancus phemiodes Stål, 1863
 Pristhesancus plagipennis Walker 1873
 Pristhesancus praecox Miller, 1958
 Pristhesancus pudicus Miller, 1958
 Pristhesancus punctatus Miller, 1958
 Pristhesancus puncticeps Miller, 1958
 Pristhesancus rendovae Miller, 1958
 Pristhesancus rubricosus Miller, 1958
 Pristhesancus rubromarginatus Distant, 1903
 Pristhesancus scintillans Miller, 1958
 Pristhesancus sericeus Miller, 1958
 Pristhesancus similis Miller, 1958
 Pristhesancus sodalis Miller, 1958
 Pristhesancus solutus Miller, 1958
 Pristhesancus stabilis Miller, 1958
 Pristhesancus suavis Miller, 1958
 Pristhesancus sylvanus Miller, 1958
 Pristhesancus taminatus Miller, 1958
 Pristhesancus temeratus Miller, 1958
 Pristhesancus tinctus Miller, 1958
 Pristhesancus tulagiensis Miller, 1958
 Pristhesancus turbidus Miller, 1958
 Pristhesancus variabilis Distant, 1903
 Pristhesancus venator Miller, 1958
 Pristhesancus vestitus Miller, 1958
 Pristhesancus vittatus Miller, 1958
 Pristhesancus wallacei Distant, 1903
 Pristhesancus ysabelicus Miller, 1958
 Pristhesancus zetterstedti Stal, 1859

References

Reduviidae
Insects of Australia